The 2013–14 season was Hamilton Academical's first season in the newly formed Scottish Championship and their third consecutive season in the second tier of Scottish football. Hamilton also competed in the League Cup, Scottish Cup and the Challenge Cup.

Summary

Season
Hamilton finished second in the Scottish Championship with 67 points. They were promoted to the Scottish Premiership in May 2014 after defeating HIbernian in the premiership play-offs. Hamilton also reached the third rounds of the Scottish Cup and League Cup and the first round of the Challenge Cup.

Results and fixtures

Scottish Championship

Premiership play-off

Scottish Challenge Cup

Scottish League Cup

Scottish Cup

League table

Division summary

Transfers

Players in

Players out

References

Hamilton Academical F.C. seasons
Hamilton Academical